Heinz Oestergaard (born 15 August 1916 in Berlin; died 10 May 2003 in Bad Reichenhall) was a German fashion designer.

He was considered one of the leading German fashion designers of the postwar period. After having succeeded in Berlin, where he designed clothes for Zarah Leander and Maria Schell, Oestergaard went to Munich in 1967. He there became the fashion manager of the catalogue company Quelle. He there replaced the customary wire used for bodices by stretch fabric. In 1971 he designed police uniforms and the green uniforms of the German police forces.

Awards

 1996: Verdienstorden des Landes Berlin (Order of Merit of Berlin)
 1996: Bundesverdienstkreuz 1. Klasse der Bundesrepublik Deutschland (Officer's Cross of the Federal Republic of Germany)

References

External links
 Homepage Heinz Oestergaard
 Wearable fashion for millions of people 2003
 Er liebte das Leben, die Menschen und seine Arbeit wie kein anderer: Oestergaard ist verstorben. He loved life, people and his work like no other: Oestergaard died on uni-protokolle.de.

German fashion designers
Officers Crosses of the Order of Merit of the Federal Republic of Germany
2003 deaths
1916 births
Recipients of the Order of Merit of Berlin